The Fighting Cheat is a 1926 American silent Western film. Directed by Richard Thorpe, the film stars Hal Taliaferro, Jean Arthur, and Ted Rackerby. It was released on February 11, 1926.

Cast list
 Hal Taliaferro as Wally Kenyon (credited as Wally Wales)
 Jean Arthur as Ruth Wells
 Ted Rackerby as Lafe Wells
 Fanny Midgley as Mrs. Wells
 Slim Whitaker as Jud Nolan (credited as Charles Whitaker) 
 V. L. Barnes as Doctor
 Al Taylor as Cook

References

Films directed by Richard Thorpe
1926 Western (genre) films
1926 films
American black-and-white films
Silent American Western (genre) films
1920s American films